Len Richardson (born 5 May 1950) is an Australian cricketer. He played eight first-class matches for New South Wales and Queensland between 1975/76 and 1976/77.

See also
 List of New South Wales representative cricketers

References

External links
 

1950 births
Living people
Australian cricketers
New South Wales cricketers
Queensland cricketers
Cricketers from Sydney